Ivo Dawson (13 December 1879 - 7 March 1934) was a British actor.

Dawson was born in Rutland, England, UK and died in Los Angeles, California, USA, age 54.

Selected filmography
 The Miracle of Love (1919)
 The Broken Melody (1919)
 The Truth About Husbands (1920)
 Footlights and Shadows (1920)
 The Great Adventure (1921)
 The Princess of New York (1921)
 The Other Person (1921)
 The Money Maniac (1921)
 The Green Caravan (1922)
 Bentley's Conscience (1922)
 Diana of the Crossways (1922)
 Out to Win (1923)
 The Woman Who Obeyed (1923)
 Straws in the Wind (1924)
 After the Verdict (1929)
 The Hate Ship (1929)

References

External links

1879 births
1934 deaths
English male film actors
English male silent film actors
People from Rutland
20th-century English male actors
British emigrants to the United States